Horror Show may refer to:

The Horror Show a 1989 supernatural horror film 
Horror Show (album), an album by Iced Earth
Gregory Horror Show, an anime
The Rocky Horror Show, a long-running British stage musical
Zee Horror Show, a television show
Horrorshow (band), an Australian hip-hop duo
Horrorshow (G.I. Joe), a fictional character in the G.I. Joe universe
Horror Show (Graydon Creed), a fictional character in the Age Of Apocalypse Marvel Universe
Horror Show, a debut EP by rock band The Graduate
Horrorshow, a song by English rock band The Libertines
Kitty Horrorshow, video game developer
Other
"horrorshow", a word in Nadsat, the fictional language used in Anthony Burgess's A Clockwork Orange
Derived from хорошо (khorosho), a Russian language word meaning "very good."